The Dundalk and Newry Steam Packet Company provided shipping services between Dundalk and Liverpool from 1871 to 1926.

History

In 1871 the Dundalk Steam Packet Company amalgamated with the Newry Steam Packet Company to form the Dundalk and Newry Steam Packet Company. This survived until 1926 when it was taken over by the British and Irish Steam Packet Company, part of the Coast Lines group.

Services from Liverpool to Dundalk and Newry ceased in 1968.

References

Transport companies established in 1871
Transport companies disestablished in 1926
Packet (sea transport)
Shipping companies of Ireland
Transport in Dundalk
1926 disestablishments in Ireland
Irish companies established in 1871